Syargozero is a rural locality (a village) in Megorskoye Rural Settlement, Vytegorsky District, Vologda Oblast, Russia. The population was 17 as of 2002.

Geography 
Syargozero is located 83 km south of Vytegra (the district's administrative centre) by road. Mezhozerye is the nearest rural locality.

References 

Rural localities in Vytegorsky District